Statistics of the Scottish Football League in season 1977–78.

Scottish Premier Division

Scottish First Division

Scottish Second Division

See also
1977–78 in Scottish football

References

 
Scottish Football League seasons